Angela Chow (周瑛琦 Zhou Yingqi; 5 August 1972) is a Taiwanese-Canadian actress and TV host best known for hosting Miss World 2003 until Miss World 2011 and back again in Miss World 2015 to Miss World 2018 .

Her family moved to Canada when she was seven. She is fluent in English and Mandarin. She was a former VJ for MTV Asia and Channel V music channels.

Currently, Chow is a bilingual TV host at the global Chinese network of Phoenix Satellite Television in Hong Kong. Highlights include hosting nine consecutive Miss World Finals, Beijing 2008 Opening and Closing Ceremonies, 2008 Beijing Paralympic Opening and Closing Ceremonies, 2007 Shanghai Special Olympics, 2010 Guangzhou Asian Games and 2009 Taipei Defalympics Opening Ceremonies Preshow, Taiwan's 44th Golden Horse Film Awards, the 4th to 6th HK Asian Film Awards, United Nations' Thirty Years in China Forum and 2008 Olympic torch bearer in Sanya. Born in Taipei and raised in Canada, she was first-place winner of MTV Asia's VJ Search. Her diversity of programs has since developed from entertainment, news to culture. She currently hosts Phoenix TV's highly rated cultural programs "China's National Centre for Performing Arts in Beijing" (大劇院‧零距離) and "Architectural Dreams" (築夢天下). Through her work, she is dedicated to nurturing goodwill and understanding between the East and the West. In 2010, she was listed on the "China's 50 Most Charismatic."

References

External links

Taiwanese emigrants to Canada
VJs (media personalities)
Living people
Beauty pageant hosts
1972 births